The Church of St James is a Church of England parish church in Baldersby St James, North Yorkshire. This Victorian church is a grade I listed building, and was designed by William Butterfield.

History

St James' was built between 1856 and 1858, and was designed by William Butterfield. It had been commissioned by William Dawnay, 7th Viscount Downe. It is made of snecked stone with ashlar details and has a red tile roof. It is High Victorian in style. The church consists of a west tower, a five-bay aisled nave, a south porch, and a two-bay unaisled chancel.

The grounds of the church and its churchyard measure 1.38 acres. The wall of the churchyard is itself a grade II listed structure. The church has a lych gate which is grade I listed. The church itself was designated a grade I listed building on 26 May 1971.

Present day
The parish of Baldersby with Dishforth is in the Archdeaconry of Cleveland of the Diocese of York.

Notable burials
The burials in the churchyard date from 1857 and include the following:

 The Revd George Boddy, former vicar of St James'
 John Brennand, High Sheriff of Yorkshire from 1915 to 1916, and his wife
 William Dawnay, 7th Viscount Downe (1812–1857), and his wife, and her second husband
 The Revd Thomas Foulkes, former vicar of St James'
 The Revd Brian Johnson, former vicar of St James'
 The Revd Zechariah Jones, former vicar of St James'

References

External links

 Church website
 A Church Near You entry

Baldersby
Baldersby
Baldersby
William Butterfield buildings